Shmoel Elyashiv (born Shmuel Fridman, October 11, 1899 Pinsk, Russian Empire – June 20, 1955) was an Israel diplomat and writer.

Biography
Elyashiv was raised in Kovno. He studied jurisprudence in Moscow and Kiev, graduated in Kharkiv in 1921.  In 1927, he received his doctorate in political science from the University of Toulouse and in 1928, was practicing as a jurist in Kovno.  Elyashiv was chairman of the central committee of the Zionist Socialist Party from 1927 until 1934, when he emigrated to Palestine.

Career

Politics/diplomacy
He held several positions with Histadrut from 1937 until 1948.  He left to become the manager of the East European section in the Israeli Ministry of Foreign Affairs. He served as ambassador to Prague, Czechoslovakia and Budapest, Hungary from 1950 until 1951.  He was a member of the Israeli delegation to the United Nations in 1950 and 1952 and served as Israel's ambassador to Moscow, 1951–1955.,

Literary career

  (The Histadrut) (Tel Aviv, 1947) (textbook)
 (Ukrainian motifs), short stories (Berlin-Paris, 1926)
 (Paris: Librairie Generale de Droit and de Jurisprudence, 1927)
 (Impressions of a journey) (Tel Aviv, 1951),
 (New Soviet literature) (Tel Aviv, 1953)

References

External links
When Ben-Gurion Defended Stalin

People from Kaunas
University of Toulouse alumni
1899 births
1955 deaths
Belarusian Jews
Jews from the Russian Empire
Lithuanian emigrants to Mandatory Palestine
Israeli people of Belarusian-Jewish descent
Ambassadors of Israel to Hungary
Ambassadors of Israel to Czechoslovakia
Ambassadors of Israel to the Soviet Union